Gia-Fu Feng (19191985) was prominent as both an English translator (with his wife, Jane English) of Taoist classics and a Taoist teacher in the United States, associated with Alan Watts, Jack Kerouac, The Beats and Abraham Maslow.

Early life 
He was born in Shanghai in 1919 into a fairly wealthy family of some influence. His father was a prominent banker, one of the founders of the Bank of China; his mother died when he was 16. He was educated privately in his own home in the classics of the Chinese tradition and in private boarding schools. He was for several months tutored by the wife of the British Consul-General. His family members were Buddhist. For the springtime holiday, they traveled to the ancestral tombs in Yuyao, in Chekiang Province, for the spring festivals. During the Japanese invasion, Gia-Fu went to Kunming in Free China to complete his bachelor's degree at Southwest Associated University in the liberal arts. Gia-Fu once commented that he had become a millionaire three times in his life, giving his money away each time. The first time was when he worked for the bank in Kunming.

Career 
After he returned to Shanghai in 1946, he left again in 1947, to go to the U.S. for a master's degree in international finance at the Wharton School at the University of Pennsylvania. After the communists took over China and the Korean War began, U.S. policy kept many Chinese students from returning home. Then, when Chinese Communist Party policies made life for the Feng family less certain, his father advised him to stay in the U.S. During the Cultural Revolution, some members of his family were persecuted.

After this, he started wandering across the country “in an old jalopy”. He spent some time in a Quaker community, lived in a Georgia commune during the time of the Supreme Court decision in Brown v The Topeka Board of Education, and in the mid-fifties moved to the West Coast. There, he 'hung out' with Jack Kerouac and other Dharma Bums, and began teaching Taoism.

Initially he translated Chinese classics for Alan Watts at the American Academy of Asian Studies, the center where Alan Watts served as administrator and primary teacher. Watts was later to state that Gia-Fu was “The Real Thing”, sending aspiring Beat-and-Hippie Taoists to him.

Watts' championing of Gia-Fu as a genuine Taoist Adept substantially abetted sales of Gia-Fu and his wife, Jane English's classic Taoist philosophy, coffee-table picture-books, which were published by Random House in many languages. Gia-Fu and Jane's books contained Jane's artistic black-and-white photos in conjunction with his outstanding calligraphy and readily understood wisdom translations. They initiated an important segment of what would become for the global book industry a highly popular, multicultural spirituality and philosophy genre. They also foreshadowed a trend toward multi-media usage in an emergent, classy, holistic marketplace.

  Gia-Fu became involved in the East-West philosophy and spirituality movement that occurred in Northern California, centered by the evolution of the AAAS, reformed as the California Institute of Integral Studies. This was part of a core sociocultural transformation that became known as the San Francisco Renaissance. Regarding that, Alan Watts stated, “I know what it is, but when you ask me, I don't. I am too close to what has happened to see it in proper perspective. I know only that between, say, 1958 and 1970 a huge tide of spiritual energy in the form of poetry, music, philosophy, painting, religion, communications techniques in radio, television, and cinema, dancing, theater, and general life-style swept out of this city and its environs to affect America and the whole world.”

Michael Murphy, a primary founder of Esalen Institute, was also a student at the AAAS during his Stanford student days. From this network, including the community of the Sri Aurobindo Ashram in San Francisco, the seeds of Esalen were planted. Gia-Fu was drawn to Esalen by his close friend Dick Price. At Esalen, Gia-Fu served as accountant, “Keeper of the Baths” and Crazy Taoist, a few stories of which can be found in the entertaining and informative history of Esalen and birth of the Human Potential Movement, The Upstart Spring.

During the early and mid-1960s Gia-Fu and Fritz Perls, arguably Esalen's key resident teacher during that era, had a difficult relationship, with Perls being the primary reason Gia-Fu left Esalen only after creating the original Stillpoint retreat center on Bear Creek Road and Skyline in the Los Gatos/Santa Cruz Mountains, where he and Jane English translated the Tao Te Ching between 1968-1972. This version is still the most popular English version with over 1,250,000 copies sold. There, Gia-Fu held Perls in high esteem, and was very distraught when Perls died in 1970.} Perls' Gestalt Therapy and method of enlightenment became a primary influence in Gia-Fu's later work. Gia-Fu also viewed Virginia Satir, a famous resident teacher of Esalen, and her practice of Family therapy as a primary influence in his own advancement of such, which he termed “Cultural Therapy.”

To illustrate how different people perceived Gia-Fu, one person writes: Toward the end of the 1960s Gia-Fu gained a great degree of notoriety as a Patriarch of the Countercultural Free Love movement. As a hippie-beaded, Chinese Guru and Taoist Adept, he became popular as a focus for newspapers and magazines around California. At the time, Taoist-Buddhist Yoga was not popularly known, and Gia-Fu effectively acted as the primary agent or Master in America teaching such. He founded his own center of Taoist studies in the Sangre de Cristo Mountains and called it Stillpoint, after T. S. Eliot's Four Quartets. Gia-Fu and Stillpoint soon proved to be a magnet for aspiring Indian Yoga-meets-Chinese Tao seekers. His biographer views this phase of his life very differently, understanding that Gia-Fu shunned guru-type associations and yearned to create a community where people lived simply, honestly, together in nature. He loved to call himself a charlatan.

On Christmas Day, 1970, Gia-Fu and Jane English were married in Mill Valley in a ceremony performed by Alan Watts. In 1972 Gia-Fu and Jane moved Stillpoint to Manitou Springs, Colorado, purchasing a  very large, old house on Ruxton Ave close to the foot of Barr Trail leading up to Pikes Peak. Residents paid either a nominal fee for room and board ($5/day in 1975) or did needed maintenance work on the rambling house and outbuildings.  From there, he and Jane finished the translation of the Chuang Tzu. He became something of a legend as the Chinese Master who would walk up daily along the Pike's Peak Cog Railway track.

In the spring of 1978, after an intensive two years of challenging his students (using a great amount of what is traditionally called in China, Lung Ch'i, roaring in a compassionate and awakening way) yet not finding them suitable for the engagement of what in Chan/Zen tradition is termed Dharma transmission, Gia-Fu enlisted the assistance of a Tibetan Buddhist Rimpoche to stay for 100 days at Stillpoint. By this period, Gia-Fu's students were primarily Germans, other Europeans, and the mysterious Lasso, a young American who became Gia-Fu's favorite and protégé in the early 1980s. During the last eight years of his life, Gia-Fu devoted most of his teaching effort to holding Tao Camps in Europe, Canada, Australia, and the final incarnation of the Stillpoint ranch near Wetmore, Colorado, teaching T'ai chi and Shing-i and, more broadly, the Tao.

Death 
Gia-Fu died in 1985, most likely of emphysema. He left behind him several unpublished manuscripts including the I-Ching, The Yellow Emperor's Inner Classic (of Medicine), and a partial, stream-of-consciousness autobiography. He left his matters in the care of Margaret Susan Wilson, friend and Stillpoint attorney. Sue Bailey, his partner at the time of his death (he and Jane parted company earlier, but never divorced) had the I Ching published in Australia. When Margaret Susan died in 1991, his estate passed to Carol Wilson, Margaret's sister. Carol's award-winning biography, Still Point of the Turning World: The Life of Gia-fu Feng, was released by Amber Lotus Publishing in April, 2009. Gia-Fu's translation of the Tao Te Ching remains popular and widely available. It includes photos by his wife, Jane English. Like his translation of Chuang Tsu, the translation was a collaboration between them with participation by other students.

Bibliography
 Tai Chi, A Way of Centering & I Ching (1970)
  "Still Point of the Turning World: The Life of Gia-fu Feng" Carol Ann Wilson, Amber Lotus Publishing (2009)
 Lao Tsu - Tao Te Ching (calligraphy) in collaboration with Jane English (1972)
 Chuang Tsu - Inner Chapters in collaboration with Jane English (1974)

References

External links
"Daoist Teachers in North America", compiled by Louis Komjathy

1919 births
1985 deaths
American writers of Chinese descent
Beat Generation people
Chinese–English translators
20th-century Chinese translators
Writers from Shanghai
20th-century American translators
People from Manitou Springs, Colorado
National Southwestern Associated University alumni
Chinese emigrants to the United States